

Incidents

1857, Hong Kong. Esing Bakery incident: 300–500 people consumed bread adulterated with large quantities of arsenic. Only three deaths were recorded, since the amount of arsenic was high enough to induce vomiting and prevent digestion. It is unknown whether the contamination was deliberate or accidental.
 1858, England. Bradford sweets poisoning: Sweets accidentally made with arsenic were sold from a market stall which led to the poisoning of more than 200 people, including 21 deaths.
 1858, United States. In the New York Swill milk scandal, an estimated 8,000 infants died in just one year, during the years long duration of adulterated milk.
1900 English beer poisoning
 1923 Elks National Home in Bedford, Virginia. Nine killed by apple cider contaminated by a pesticide.
1964 The whole planet earth. A satellite called SNAP9a with 1 kilogram (2.2 lb) of plutonium-238 exploded and was distributed over all continents.
1967, Colombia. Nutibara bakery poisoning: At least 78 people died and 800 recorded intoxicated after consuming bread baked with flour that was contaminated when bottles containing Paratiol, a potent insecticide spilled over the flour bags during transit. 
1968, Japan. Yushō disease; mass poisoning resulting from rice bran oil contaminated with polychlorinated biphenyls in Kyūshū killed more than 500.
1971, Iraq. Iraq poison grain disaster: A mass poisoning by grain treated with a methylmercury fungicide which was imported to the country as seed and never intended for human consumption. According to several estimates, the recorded death toll varies from 459 to 650 people, though much higher estimates have been offered. 
1973, United States. Michigan cattle poisoning with PBB: A fire retardant chemical was accidentally mixed in with cattle feed and consumed by over 30,000 dairy cows.

 1979, Soviet Union. Sverdlovsk anthrax leak in which spores of Bacillus anthracis (the causative agent of anthrax) were accidentally released from a Soviet military research facility in the city of Sverdlovsk, (now Yekaterinburg, Russia), leading to deaths of at least 66 people. 
 1981, Spain. An outbreak of Toxic oil syndrome supposedly caused by contaminated colza oil killed over 600 people.
 1982, United States. The Chicago Tylenol murders, an unsolved case of drug tampering in the Chicago area. Seven deaths were linked to the potassium cyanide poisoning, leading to a nationwide recall of Tylenol products. 
 1984, India. The Bhopal disaster (also known as Bhopal gas tragedy): A gas leak incident which led to at least 3,787 deaths.
 1988, England. Camelford water pollution incident: The accidental contamination of the drinking water supply to 20,000 local people and up to 10,000 tourists of the town of Camelford with 20 tonnes of aluminium sulphate. Officially, there were no deaths caused by the accident.
1998 Delhi oil poisoning, adulterated mustard oil resulted in 60 deaths.
 2008 Chinese milk scandal. Milk and infant formula along with other food materials and components were adulterated with melamine. An estimated 294,000 victims, six babies died from kidney stones and other kidney damage.
 2010, Nigeria. A series of lead poisonings in Zamfara State led to the deaths of at least 163 people.
 2014, Flint water crisis. Over 100,000 residents of Flint, Michigan exposed to elevated lead levels in the water supply, including up to 12,000 children, resulting in brain damage to many of the children. 
 2016, Pakistan. Punjab sweet poisoning: An accidental contamination of baked confectionery with illegal agriculture pesticides led to at least 33 deaths.
 2021, Bosnia and Herzegovina. Tribistovo poisoning: A carbon monoxide leak from a power generator led to the deaths of eight teenagers.
 2023, Iran. Iranian schoolgirls mass poisoning reports

See also
 List of food contamination incidents
 List of foodborne illness outbreaks
 List of medicine contamination incidents

References

Man-made
Man-made
Man-made